The women's competition in the flyweight (– 48 kg) division was held on 9 April 2012.

Schedule

Medalists

Records
Prior to the competition, the following records were as follows.

Results

References

Start List
Results 

European Weightlifting Championships
Euro